Before the Beast is a 7 track mixtape by rapper Young Buck, hosted by DJ Whoo Kid. It is the first official mixtape from Buck under G-Unit after being dismissed from the group in 2008. The mixtape features 7 exclusive tracks from Young Buck with appearances by his label mates Lloyd Banks, Tony Yayo, Kidd Kidd, and more. It was released for digital download on February 12, 2015.

Background
The mixtape was released by Young Buck to promote the upcoming G-Unit EP, The Beast Is G-Unit.

Track listing

References

External links
Download
 

2015 mixtape albums
Young Buck albums
Albums produced by Drumma Boy
Albums produced by Sonny Digital